G protein-coupled receptor family C group 6 member A (GPRC6A) is a protein that in humans is encoded by the GPRC6A gene. This protein functions as a receptor of L-α-amino acids, cations (e.g., calcium), osteocalcin, and steroids. It is a membrane androgen receptor.

Clinical significance
GPRC6A has also been linked to prostate cancer progression, and it has been shown to mediate rapid, non-genomic prostate cancer cell responses to testosterone.

See also
 ZIP9

References

Further reading

External links
 
 

G protein-coupled receptors